The 2012 Arkansas Razorbacks baseball team represented the University of Arkansas in baseball at the Division I level in the NCAA for the 2012 season. Dave van Horn was the coach in his tenth year at his alma mater. The team clinched a berth in the 2012 College World Series after winning the Waco Super Regional on June 11.

Coaches

Source: arkansasrazorbacks.com

Roster

Schedule

|-  style="text-align:center; background:#bfb;"
| 1 || 2/17/12 ||  || Baum Stadium || 11–5 || Baxendale (1–0) || Helisek (0–1) || – || 7,312 || 1–0 || 
|-  style="text-align:center; background:#bfb;"
| 2 || 2/18/12 || Villanova || Baum Stadium || 13–1 || Stanek (1–0) || Young (0–1) || – || 7,072 || 2–0 || 
|-  style="text-align:center; background:#bfb;"
| 3 || 2/19/12 || Villanova || Baum Stadium || 17–1 || Astin (1–0) || Almonte (0–1) || – || 7,456 || 3–0 || 
|-  style="text-align:center; background:#bfb;"
| 4 || 2/21/12 ||  || Baum Stadium || 8 –7 || Sanburn (1–0) || Roman (0–1) || – || 6,132 || 4–0 || 
|-  style="text-align:center; background:#bfb;"
| 5 || 2/22/12 || Northwestern State || Baum Stadium || 6–2 || Reyes (1–0) || Adams (0–1) || – || 6,382 || 5–0 || 
|-  style="text-align:center; background:#bfb;"
| 6 || 2/24/12 ||  || Baum Stadium || 7–3 || Baxendale (2–0) || Deetjen (0–1) || Lynch (1) || 6,194 || 6–0 || 
|-  style="text-align:center; background:#bfb;"
| 7 || 2/25/12 || Valparaiso || Baum Stadium || 4–3 || Stanek (2–0) || Wormington (0–1) || Astin (1) || 7,380 || 7–0 || 
|-  style="text-align:center; background:#fbb;"
| 8 || 2/26/12 || Valparaiso || Baum Stadium || 9-10 (10) || Miller (1–0) || Sanburn (1–1) || – || 6,885 || 7–1 || 
|-  style="text-align:center; background:#bfb;"
| 9 || 2/28/12 ||  || Baum Stadium || 5–0 || Moore (1–0) || Westensee (0–1) || – || 6,255 || 8–1 || 
|-  style="text-align:center; background:#bfb;"
| 10 || 2/29/12 || BYU || Baum Stadium || 8–1 || Baxendale (3–0) || Poulson (0–1) || – || 6,846 || 9–1 || 
|-  style="text-align:center; background:#bfb;"
| 11 || 3/2/12 || Texas Tech || Minute Maid Park || 3–1 || Stanek (3–0) || von Schamann (2–1) || Astin (2) ||8,540 || 10–1 || 
|-  style="text-align:center; background:#fbb;"
| 12 || 3/3/12 ||  || Minute Maid Park || 1–4 || Lewis (2–1) || Fant (0–1) || Morehouse (1) || – || 10–2 ||
|-  style="text-align:center; background:#bfb;"
| 13 || 3/4/12 || #21 Texas || Minute Maid Park || 7–3 || Baxendale (4–0) || Jacquez (0–1) || Astin (3) || – || 11–2 || 
|-  style="text-align:center; background:#bfb;"
| 14 || 3/9/12 ||  || Baum Stadium || 4–0 || Stanek (4–0) || Augliera (0–2) || – || 6,914 || 12–2 || 
|-  style="text-align:center; background:#bfb;"
| 15 || 3/10/12 || Binghamton || Baum Stadium || 5–3 || Baxendale (5–0) || Lynch (0–2) || Moore (1) || – || 13–2 || 
|-  style="text-align:center; background:#bfb;"
| 16 || 3/10/12 || Binghamton || Baum Stadium || 6–0  || Fant (1–1) || Lambert (0–2)  || – || 8,963 || 14–2  ||
|-  style="text-align:center; background:#bfb;"
| 17 || 3/13/12 ||  || Baum Stadium || 1–0 || Suggs (1–0) || Moon (1–1) || Astin (4) || 7,420 || 15–2 || 
|-  style="text-align:center; background:#bfb;"
| 18 || 3/14/12 || Gonzaga || Baum Stadium || 5-3 || Moore (2–0) || Abbruzza (0–2) || Astin (5) || 6,578 || 16–2 ||
|-  style="text-align:center; background:#bfb;"
| 19 || 3/16/12 || Alabama || Baum Stadium || 4–3 (12) || Astin (2–0) || Rosencrans (0–1) || – || 8,530 || 17–2 || 1–0
|-  style="text-align:center; background:#bfb;"
| 20 || 3/17/12 || Alabama || Baum Stadium || 8–4 || Stanek (5–0) || Guilbeau (1–2) || Moore (2) || 9,615 || 18-2 || 2–0
|-  style="text-align:center; background:#bfb;"
| 21 || 3/18/12 || Alabama || Baum Stadium || 7–4 || Sanburn (2–1) || Pilkington (0–2) || Astin (6) || 8,426 || 19–2 || 3–0
|- align="center" bgcolor="#bbbbbb"
| 22 || 3/20/12 ||  || Baum Stadium || colspan=7|Postponed (rain)
|-  style="text-align:center; background:#bfb;"
| 23 || 3/21/12 || Nevada || Baum Stadium || 10–2 || Oliver (1-0) || Marks (0–2) || – || 6,502 || 20–2 || 3–0
|-  style="text-align:center; background:#fbb;"
| 24 || 3/23/12 || at Mississippi State || Dudy Noble Field || 2-11 || Stratton (5-0) || Baxendale (5-1) || - || 6,289 || 20-3 || 3-1
|-  style="text-align:center; background:#bfb;"
| 25 || 3/24/12 || at Mississippi State || Dudy Noble Field || 8-0 || Stanek (6-0) || Routt (1-3) || - || 6,763 || 21-3 || 4-1
|-  style="text-align:center; background:#bfb;"
| 26 || 3/25/12 || at Mississippi State || Dudy Noble Field || 8-5 (11) || Suggs (2-0) || Reed (0-4) || Lynch (2) || 6,228 || 22-3 || 5-1
|-  style="text-align:center; background:#fbb;"
| 27 || 3/30/12 || at #15 LSU  || Alex Box Stadium || 10-6 || Gausman (5-0) || Lynch (0-1) || - || 11,095 || 22-4 || 5-2
|-  style="text-align:center; background:#fbb;"
| 28 || 3/31/12 || at #15 LSU  || Alex Box Stadium || 1-2 || Cotton (3-0) || Astin (2-1) || - || 11,710 || 22-5 || 5-3
|-  style="text-align:center; background:#fbb;"
| 29 || 4/1/12 || at #15 LSU  || Alex Box Stadium || 2-3 (11) || Bourgeois (1-1) || Astin (2-2) || - || 10,686 || 22-6 || 5-4
|-  style="text-align:center; background:#fbb;"
| 30 || 4/6/12 ||   || Baum Stadium || 4-2 || Wood (4-1) || Stanek (6-1) || - || 9,033 || 22-7 || 5-5
|-  style="text-align:center; background:#bfb;"
| 31 || 4/7/12 || Georgia  || Baum Stadium || 8-3 || Moore (3-0) || Palazzone (0-4) || - || 8,479 || 23-7 || 6-5
|-  style="text-align:center; background:#bfb;"
| 32 || 4/8/12 || Georgia  || Baum Stadium || 8-0 || Baxendale (6-1) || Nagel (0-1) || - || 6,973 || 24-7 || 7-5
|-  style="text-align:center; background:#fbb;"
| 33 || 4/10/12 || at   || Dale Mitchell Park || 0-4 || Magnifico (1-0) || Fant (1-2) || Okert (1) || 1,537 || 24-8 || 7-5
|-  style="text-align:center; background:#bfb;"
| 34 || 4/13/12 || #3 Kentucky  || Baum Stadium || 8-7 || Lynch (1-1) || Phillips (5-1) || - || 9,287 || 25-8 || 8-5
|-  style="text-align:center; background:#fbb;"
| 35 || 4/14/12 || #3 Kentucky  || Baum Stadium || 4-5 || Shepherd (3-0) || Astin (2-3) || Peterson (1) || 9,575 || 25-9 || 8-6
|-  style="text-align:center; background:#fbb;"
| 36 || 4/14/12 || #3 Kentucky  || Baum Stadium || 1-2 || Littrell (6-0) || Baxendale (6-2) || Gott (8) || 9,575 || 25-10 || 8-7
|-  style="text-align:center; background:#bfb;"
| 37 || 4/17/12 ||   || Baum Stadium || 8-3 || Fant (2-2) || Landers (0-2) || Daniel (1) || 7,464 || 26-10 || 8-7
|-  style="text-align:center; background:#bfb;"
| 38 || 4/17/12 || Stephen F. Austin  || Baum Stadium || 4-3 || Suggs (3-0) || Dozier (0-1) || - || 7,464 || 27-10 || 8-7
|-  style="text-align:center; background:#fbb;"
| 39 || 4/21/12 || at #22   || Swayze Field || 2-8 || Greenwood (1-0) || Moore (3-1) || - || 7,647 || 27-11 || 8-8
|-  style="text-align:center; background:#fbb;"
| 40 || 4/21/12 || at #22 Ole Miss  || Swayze Park || 0-1 || Mayers (4-2) || Stanek (6-2)  || Hively (1) || 10,603 || 27-12 || 8-9
|-  style="text-align:center; background:#bfb;"
| 41 || 4/22/12 || at #22 Ole Miss  || Swayze Park || 11-3 || Lynch (2-1) || Smith (2-3) || - || 8,115 || 28-12 || 9-9
|-  style="text-align:center; background:#bfb;"
| 42 || 4/24/12 ||   || Baum Stadium || 6-1 || Daniel (1-0) || Wilson (1-2) || - || 6,837 || 29-12 || 9-9
|-  style="text-align:center; background:#fbb;"
| 43 || 4/27/12 || at #5 Florida || McKethan Stadium || 2-3 || Randall (4-1) || Stanek (6-3) || Maddox (12) || 3,906 || 29-13 || 9-10
|-  style="text-align:center; background:#bfb;"
| 44 || 4/28/12 || at #5 Florida || McKethan Stadium || 5-1 || Moore (4-1) || Johnson (5-3) || - || 4,894 || 30-13 || 10-10
|-  style="text-align:center; background:#bfb;"
| 45 || 4/29/12 || at #5 Florida || McKethan Stadium || 3-1 (10) || Suggs (4-0) || Magliozzi (4-2)  || Astin (7) || 3,927 || 31-13 || 11-10
|-  style="text-align:center; background:#bfb;"
| 46 || 5/1/12 || Missouri || Baum Stadium ||  6-3 || Sanburn (3-1) || Holovach (5-4) || - || 7,051 || 32-13 || 11-10
|-  style="text-align:center; background:#bfb;"
| 47 || 5/2/12 || Missouri || Baum Stadium || 2-0 || Gunn (1-0) || Walsh (2-3) || Astin (8) || 6,840 || 33-13 || 11-10
|-  style="text-align:center; background:#fbb;"
| 48 || 5/4/12 || #5 South Carolina || Baum Stadium || 6-8 (10) || Beal (3-3) || Astin (2-4) || Price (7) || 8,982 || 33-14 || 11-11
|-  style="text-align:center; background:#bfb;"
| 49 || 5/5/12 || #5 South Carolina || Baum Stadium || 7-6 || Wright (1-0) || Montgomery (4-1) || Astin (9) || 8,774 || 34-14 || 12-11
|-  style="text-align:center; background:#fbb;"
| 50 || 5/6/12 || #5 South Carolina || Baum Stadium || 7-10 || Price (4-3) || Baxendale (6-3) || - || 8,461 || 34-15 || 12-12
|-  style="text-align:center; background:#fbb;"
| 51 || 5/10/12 ||  || Baum Stadium || 2-3 (10) || Varnadore (3-7) || Astin (2-5) || - || 7,555 || 34-16 || 12-13
|-  style="text-align:center; background:#bfb;"
| 52 || 5/11/12 || Auburn || Baum Stadium || 5-4 || Suggs (5-0) || Smith (3-5) || - || 8,536 || 35-16 || 13-13
|-  style="text-align:center; background:#fbb;"
| 53 || 5/12/12 || Auburn || Baum Stadium || 5-12 || Smith (4-5) || Moore (4-2) || Bryant (5) || 8,512 || 35-17 || 13-14
|-  style="text-align:center; background:#bfb;"
| 54 || 5/15/12 ||  || Dickey-Stephens Park || 6-5 (10) || Astin (3-5) || Dudley (4-4) || - || 10,512 || 36-17 || 13-14
|-  style="text-align:center; background:#bfb;"
| 55 || 5/17/12 ||  || Lindsey Nelson Stadium || 8-0 || Baxendale (7-3) || Saberhagen (5-3) || - || 1,721 || 37-17 || 14-14
|-  style="text-align:center; background:#bfb;"
| 56 || 5/18/12 || Tennessee || Lindsey Nelson Stadium || 10-3 || Lynch (3-1) || Williams (3-5) || - || 1,808 || 38-17 || 15-14
|-  style="text-align:center; background:#bfb;"
| 57 || 5/19/12 || Tennessee || Lindsey Nelson Stadium || 8-2 || Suggs (6-0) || Stevens (1-2) || - || 2,121 || 39-17 || 16-14
|-

|-  style="text-align:center; background:#fbb;"
| 58 || 5/22/12 || vs. #24 Mississippi State || Regions Park || 1-9 || Woodruff (1-2) || Stanek (6-4) || Holder (7) || 5,489 || 39-18 || 0-1
|-  style="text-align:center; background:#fbb;"
| 59 || 5/23/12 || vs. Ole Miss || Regions Park || 0-2 || Mayers (5-3) || Baxendale (7-4) || Huber (10) || - || 39-19 || 0-2
|-

|-  style="text-align:center; background:#bfb;"
| 60 || 6/1/12 || Sam Houston State || Reckling Park || 5-4 || Moore (5-2) || Smith (8-6) || - || 3,081 || 40-19 || 1-0
|-  style="text-align:center; background:#bfb;"
| 61 || 6/2/12 || #8 Rice || Reckling Park || 1-0 || Stanek (7-4) || Kubitza (6-5) || Astin (10) || 3,869 || 41-19 || 2-0
|-  style="text-align:center; background:#bfb;"
| 62 || 6/3/12 || Sam Houston State || Reckling Park || 5-1 || Sanburn (4-1) || Dickson (4-5) || - || 2,987 || 42-19 || 3-0
|-

|-  style="text-align:center; background:#fbb;"
| 63 || 6/9/12 || #4 Baylor || Baylor Ballpark || 1-8 || Blank (11-1) || Baxendale (7-5) || - || 5,007 || 42-20 || 0-1
|-  style="text-align:center; background:#bfb;"
| 64 || 6/10/12 || #4 Baylor || Baylor Ballpark || 5-4 || Daniel (2-0) || Garner (3-3) || - || 5,038 || 43-20 || 1-1
|-  style="text-align:center; background:#bfb;"
| 65 || 6/11/12 || #4 Baylor || Baylor Ballpark || 1-0 (10) || Suggs (7-0) || Newman (4-4) || - || 5,059 || 44-20 || 2-1
|-

|-  style="text-align:center; background:#bfb;"
| 66 || 6/16/12 || Kent State || TD Ameritrade Park || 8-1 || Baxendale (8-5) || Starn (11-4) || Moore (3) || 23,980 || 45-20 || 1-0
|-  style="text-align:center; background:#bfb;"
| 67 || 6/18/12 || #7 South Carolina || TD Ameritrade Park || 2-1 || Stanek (8-4) || Holmes (7-2) || Astin (11) || 23,537 || 46-20 || 2-0
|-  style="text-align:center; background:#fbb;"
| 68 || 6/21/12 || #7 South Carolina || TD Ameritrade Park || 0-2 || Montgomery (6-1) || Fant (2-3) || Price (13) || 23,593 || 46-21 || 2-1
|-  style="text-align:center; background:#fbb;"
| 69 || 6/22/12 || #7 South Carolina || TD Ameritrade Park || 2-3 || Price (5-4) || Suggs (7-1) || - || 22,184 || 46-22 || 2-2
|-

Rankings

Razorbacks in the 2012 MLB Draft

References

External links
 Razorback Athletics

2012 in sports in Arkansas
Arkansas Razorbacks Baseball Team, 2012
Arkansas Razorbacks baseball seasons
College World Series seasons
Arkansas